The 1977 Australian Open (January) was a tennis tournament played on outdoor grass courts at the Kooyong Lawn Tennis Club in Melbourne, Australia. The tournament was held from 3 to 9 January 1977. Due to a scheduling change, two Australian Opens took place in 1977 with the second taking place in December.

Seniors

Men's singles

 Roscoe Tanner defeated  Guillermo Vilas, 6–3, 6–3, 6–3
It was Tanner's 1st (and only) career Grand Slam title.

Women's singles

 Kerry Melville Reid defeated  Dianne Fromholtz, 7–5, 6–2
It was Melville's 1st (and only) career Grand Slam title.

Men's doubles
 Arthur Ashe /  Tony Roche defeated  Charlie Pasarell /  Erik van Dillen, 6–4, 6–4

Women's doubles
 Dianne Fromholtz /  Helen Gourlay defeated  Kerry Melville Reid /  Betsy Nagelsen, 5–7, 6–1, 7–5

Mixed doubles
Competition not held between 1970 and 1986.

Juniors

Boys' singles
 Brad Drewett defeated  Tim Wilkison, 6–4, 7–6

Girls' singles
 Pamela Baily defeated  Amanda Tobin, 6–2, 6–3

References

 
 

 
1977 in Australian tennis
1
1977,Australian Open